Roqicheh (also Romanized as Roqīcheh, Raghicheh, Raqīcheh, and Roqeycheh; also known as Aghicha and Aqīcheh) is a village in Roqicheh Rural District, Kadkan District, Torbat-e Heydarieh County, Razavi Khorasan Province, Iran. At the 2006 census, its population was 360, in 97 families.

References 

Populated places in Torbat-e Heydarieh County